This is the complete list of LEN European Aquatics Championships medalists in artistic swimming since 1974.

Solo free routine

Solo technical routine

Duet free routine

Duet technical routine

Team free routine

Team technical routine

Team Free Routine Combination

Team highlights routine

Mixed duet free routine

Mixed duet technical routine

Men solo free routine

Men solo technical routine

See also
 European Aquatics Championships all-time medal table

Notes

References

External links
  Official site of the LEN

Synchronised swimming competitions
LEN European Aquatics Championships
European Aquatics Championships